Sweden national hockey team may refer to:

 Sweden men's national field hockey team
 Sweden women's national field hockey team
 Sweden men's national ice hockey team
 Sweden women's national ice hockey team
 Sweden men's national inline hockey team